Windom Peak is the highest summit of the Needle Mountains range of the Rocky Mountains of North America. The summit of Windom Peak is the highest point in La Plata County and the entire San Juan River drainage basin. The mountain was named in honor of Minnesota senator William Windom.

Climbing
Windom Peak is one of three fourteeners in the Needle Mountains; the other two are Mount Eolus and Sunlight Peak. Windom and Sunlight lie on the east side of Twin Lakes, in upper Chicago Basin, while Eolus lies on the west side. All three peaks are relatively remote by Colorado standards, and have a strong wilderness character; however they can be popular in summer.

Historical names
Windom Mountain
Windom Peak – 1974

See also

List of mountain peaks of North America
List of mountain peaks of the United States
List of mountain peaks of Colorado
List of Colorado county high points
List of Colorado fourteeners

References

External links

 
Windom Peak on Summitpost

Fourteeners of Colorado
San Juan Mountains (Colorado)
Mountains of La Plata County, Colorado
North American 4000 m summits
San Juan National Forest
Mountains of Colorado